2021 Winter SM Town: SMCU Express (stylized as 2021 Winter SMTOWN : SMCU EXPRESS) is the ninth winter album by SM Town. The studio album was released by SM Entertainment on December 27, 2021, and is available in 13 different versions. It features 10 songs, including two singles off the album, "Dreams Come True" and "Hope from Kwangya". The album marks the first SM Town's special season album release in 10 years after the predecessor 2011 Winter SMTOWN: The Warmest Gift, which was released in December 2011. It is also the first album to feature Kai, Red Velvet, NCT, and Aespa.

Background and release 

The concept of the album is based on SM Entertainment's own fictional universe called "SM Culture Universe" (SMCU), which was first introduced in 2020 by the company's founder Lee Soo-man through the debut of girl group Aespa.

Participating artists in the album include Kangta, BoA, TVXQ!, Super Junior (except Heechul among the actively-promoting members), Girls' Generation-Oh!GG, Shinee (except Taemin), Kai of Exo, Red Velvet, NCT (except Lucas), and Aespa. Also participating in the album's photoshoot were the Scream Records DJs Ginjo (formerly of Traxx), Raiden, and Imlay.

Through the SM Town 2022: SMCU Express project, 2021 Winter SM Town: SMCU Express was announced along as the first SM Town winter record by SM Entertainment in 10 years since 2011. According to SM, the album will feature various artists under the label and an "interesting combination of artists" aside from the track of existing groups. Prior to the album release, the jazz version of "The Promise of H.O.T." was pre-released on November 26, 2021, through SM Station and was added to the track listing on December 24. "Dreams Come True", which was also pre-released at SM Station on December 20, became the album's lead single. The pre-order period for the album started from December 10 and was scheduled for release on December 27.

Composition 
The lead single, "Dreams Come True", was described as a pop dance song remade by Aespa from S.E.S.'s second album Sea & Eugene & Shoo released in 1998. It combines the group's "spiritual energy and hip hop vibe" with the "mysterious and dreamy sound" with BoA participating in the song's production. The second single, "Hope from Kwangya", was described as a song with a "rich" sound of a "beautiful" string melody. It is a remake of SM Town's "representative" song, originally released from H.O.T.'s third album Resurrection in 1998. Kangta, who wrote and composed the original music, directed the vocals.

"Zoo", sung by NCT's Taeyong, Jeno, Hendery, and Yangyang and Aespa's Giselle, was described as a hip hop song with "unique" synths and "fast" tempo beats. "Melody", sung by Girls' Generation-Oh!GG, was described as a medium tempo pop song with a retro jazz atmosphere. The lyrics remind "beautiful and ecstatic" moments, creating a warm atmosphere in the cold winter with a retro jazz atmosphere created by various acoustic instruments. "Magical", sung by TVXQ and Super Junior, was described as a "cheerful" pop song with the lyrics, "Our friendship is destiny [and] miracle". "Snow Dream 2021", sung by Red Velvet's Yeri, NCT's Haechan, Chenle, and Jisung, and Aespa's Ningning, was described as a song that is "enough to feel the joy and happiness you have been waiting for in winter". It is a remake of the lead single from SM Town's winter album, Snow Dream, released in 2006. "Ordinary Day", sung by Super Junior's Kyuhyun, Shinee's Onew, and NCT's Taeil is about a "deep love" for lovers, friends, and family, who are always by one's side in the season when one realizes that every day is "special and precious". "Goodbye", sung by Girls' Generation's Sunny and NCT's Jungwoo and Renjun, was described as a medium R&B pop song with winter bell sounds, added acoustic bass, and jazzy keyboard sounds. "Dinner", sung by TVXQ, was described as a "warm" pop ballad about the moment of preparing dinner and sharing small happiness for a precious person at the end of a hard day. The song features a "dramatic" arrangement of "colorful" string melodies over an "emotional" piano performance. The jazz version of "The Promise of H.O.T." was performed by the SM Classics Town Orchestra with Yohan Kim and Hogyu 'Stiger' Hwang and drummer Shin Dong-jin. It was reinterpreted in the form of a jazz trio featuring "groovy" piano, bass, and "rhythmical" drum sounds.

Promotion 
The album was promoted through SM Town's second online concert SM Town Live 2022: SMCU Express at Kwangya on January 1, 2022, where "Dreams Come True", "Ordinary Day", "Zoo", and "Hope from Kwangya" were performed.

Commercial performance 
On January 4, 2022, it was reported that the album had sold 416,000 copies, becoming the highest selling SM Town album.

Accolades

Track listing

Notes 
 "Zoo" and "Dinner" are stylized in all caps.
"Hope from Kwangya" is stylized as "Hope from KWANGYA".

Credits and personnel 

Credits adapted from the liner notes of the album.

Musicians

 Aespa – vocals , background vocals 
 Taeyong – vocals , background vocals , Korean lyrics 
 Jeno – vocals , background vocals , Korean lyrics 
 Hendery – vocals , background vocals 
 Yangyang – vocals , background vocals 
 Giselle – vocals , background vocals , Korean lyrics 
 Girls' Generation-Oh!GG – vocals , background vocals 
 TVXQ – vocals , background vocals 
 Super Junior – vocals 
 Yeri – vocals 
 Haechan – vocals 
 Chenle – vocals 
 Jisung – vocals 
 Ningning – vocals 
 Kyuhyun – vocals , background vocals 
 Onew – vocals , background vocals 
 Taeil – vocals , background vocals 
 Sunny – vocals , background vocals 
 Jungwoo – vocals , background vocals 
 Renjun – vocals , background vocals 
 SM Town – vocals 
 Bada – Korean lyrics 
 Yoo Young-jin – Korean lyrics , composition , arrangement , background vocals 
 BoA – Korean lyrics , composition , arrangement 
 Rick Bridges(X&) – Korean lyrics 
 Jo Yoon-kyung – Korean lyrics 
 Lee Seu-ran – Korean lyrics 
 Yoon Hyo-sang – Korean lyrics 
 Kenzie – Korean lyrics , composition , arrangement 
 danke (lalala studio) – lyrics 
 Oh Hyun-sun (lalala studio) – Korean lyrics 
 Kangta – lyrics , composition 
 Risto Armas Asikainen – composition 
 Keelah Jacobsen – composition , arrangement 
 Cameron Joseph Rugg – composition 
 Ryan Jhun – composition , arrangement 
 Ronny Svendsen – composition , arrangement 
 JinByJin – composition , arrangement 
 Noday – composition 
 Cazzi Opeia – composition 
 William James 'Bleu' McAuley III – composition , arrangement , keyboard 
 Mats Valentin – composition , arrangement , drums & guitar , keyboard 
 Tobias Norberg – composition , arrangement 
 Svein Finneide – composition 
 Aslak Johnsen – composition 
 Ken Ingwersen – composition 
 Jon-Willy Rydningen – composition 
 Eirik-Andre Rydningen – composition 
 MinGtion – composition , arrangement , bass , piano 
 Kim Yeon-seo – composition , background vocals 
 Dvwn – composition 
 Jeon Sang-hwan – composition , arrangement 
 Jerome 'Jigg' Andrews – composition , arrangement 
 Shelton Jones – composition 
 Saire Jones – composition 
 Shaun Kim – arrangement 
 BXN – arrangement 
 Seo Mi-rae (ButterFly) – arrangement , background vocals 
 Kim Gyu-won – arrangement , rap making 
 Yohan Kim – arrangement , piano 
 Hwang Ho-gyu (Hogyu 'Stiger' Hwang) – arrangement , electric bass guitar & contrabass 
 Hwang Seong-je (ButterFly) – background vocals , arrangement , piano 
 Oiaisle – background vocals 
 Junny – background vocals 
 Bang In-jae – guitar 
 Park Shin-won – guitar 
 Hong Jun-ho – guitar 
 Song Young-joo – keyboard 
 Nile Lee – strings arrangement and conducting , strings arrangement 
 Han Seong-eun – strings arrangement and conducting 
 On The String – strings 
 Yung String – strings 
 SM Classics Town Orchestra – strings 
 Shin Dong-jin – drums 
 Choi Hoon – bass 

Technical

 Yoo Young-jin – directing , recording , digital editing , mixing 
 Rick Bridges(X&) – vocal directing 
 Lee Joo-hyung – vocal directing , Pro Tools operation 
 Hwang Seong-je (ButterFly) – vocal directing , Pro Tools operation , all programming 
 Kenzie – directing 
 MinGtion – directing 
 Moon Jung-jae – recording direction 
 Kangta – directing 
 Jung Yoo-ra – recording , digital editing , mixing engineer 
 Lee Min-gyu – recording , mixing 
 Lee Ji-hong – recording , mixing engineer , mixing 
 Kang Eun-ji – recording , digital editing 
 No Min-ji – recording , digital editing 
 Jeong Ki-hong – recording 
 Choi Da-in – recording 
 Lee Chan-mi – recording 
 Seo Mi-rae (ButterFly) – digital editing , vocal directing , Pro Tools operation 
 Jang Woo-young – digital editing 
 Kwon Yu-jin – digital editing 
 Jeong Eui-seok – mixing 
 Namkoong Jin – mixing 
 Kim Cheol-soon – mixing 
 Cheon Hoon – mastering
 Kwon Nam-woo – mastering
 Shin Soo-min – mastering assistant

Charts

Weekly charts

Monthly charts

Year-end charts

Singles charts

Certifications and sales

Release history

References 

SM Town albums
2021 albums
SM Entertainment albums
2021 Christmas albums
Concept albums
Christmas albums by South Korean artists
Albums produced by Lee Soo-man